The 29th TVyNovelas Awards, is an Academy of special awards to the best of soap operas and TV shows. The awards ceremony took place on March 6, 2011 in the Forum Mundo Imperial, Acapulco, Guerrero. The ceremony was televised in the Mexico by Canal de las estrellas.

Jacqueline Bracamontes and Alan Tacher hosted the show. Para volver a amar won 7 awards, the most for the evening, including Best Telenovela. Other winners Soy tu dueña won 3 awards, Cuando me enamoro won 2 awards  and Teresa and Niña de mi corazón won one each.

Summary of awards and nominations

Winners and nominees

Telenovelas

Others

Special Awards
Launching TVyNovelas: Jacqueline Sauza
Musical Career: Enrique Iglesias
Artistic Career: Ignacio López Tarso
Lifetime on Stage: Alicia Rodríguez
Lifetime Achievement by Bancomer: Jacqueline Bracamontes
Launching Stellar Female: Paulina Goto

Performers

Missing
People who did not attend ceremony wing and were nominated in the shortlist in each category:
 Ana Brenda Contreras
 Fernando Colunga (thanked in a video)
 Gloria Trevi (she was not present in his nomination)
 Lucero
 Silvia Pinal (she was present award of Artistic Career)

References 

TVyNovelas Awards
TVyNovelas Awards
TVyNovelas Awards
TVyNovelas Awards ceremonies